The 28th Billboard Latin Music Awards ceremony, presented by Billboard to honor the most popular albums, songs and performers in Latin music, took place  on September 23, 2021, at the Watsco Center in Coral Gables, Florida.

The red carpet for the event aired live on Telemundo while the ceremony was broadcast by Universo and Telemundo Internacional, the latter being for Latin America and the Caribbean.

Performers

Winners and nominees
The nominations were announced on August 12, 2021, with Puerto Rican singer Bad Bunny leading the nominations with 22, followed by Maluma with 11, J Balvin with 9 and Karol G, Anuel AA and Black Eyed Peas with 8 each. Due to the pause on touring for the last year, the category for Tour of the Year was not presented this year. In addition, the eligibility period was extended from its usual one-year period to 18 months (from February 1, 2020, to August 7, 2021), as the 2020 awards were delayed by the pandemic. Winners are listed first and highlighted in bold.

Special Merit Awards
Lifetime Achievement Award: Paquita la del Barrio
Hall of Fame: Daddy Yankee
Icon Award: Maná

References

Billboard Latin Music Awards
2021 in Latin music
2021 music awards
2021 in Florida